Leslie Gaunt (3 January 1918 – 24 July 1985), known prior to 1948 as Leslie Goldberg or Les Goldberg, was an English professional footballer who played as a right back in the Football League for Reading and Leeds United. After his retirement he managed Newbury Town, scouted for Oxford United and worked in a scouting and administrative capacity for Reading.

Personal life 
Gaunt was Jewish. He saw active service with the British Army in India during the Second World War.

Career statistics

References 

1918 births
1985 deaths
English Football League players
English footballers
Exeter City F.C. players
Association football fullbacks
Footballers from Leeds
Brentford F.C. wartime guest players
Leeds United F.C. players
Reading F.C. players
Arsenal F.C. wartime guest players
Aldershot F.C. wartime guest players
Reading F.C. wartime guest players
English football managers
Reading F.C. non-playing staff
British Army personnel of World War II
Newbury Town F.C. players
Oxford United F.C. non-playing staff

English Jews